Starokurzya (İśke Köryä) is a rural locality (a village) in Tangatarovsky Selsoviet, Burayevsky District, Bashkortostan, Russia. The population was 147 as of 2010. There are two streets.

Geography 
Starokurzya is located 41 km southwest of Burayevo (the district's administrative centre) by road. Sait-Kurzya is the nearest rural locality.

References 

Rural localities in Burayevsky District